Pariyur is a panchayat village located near Gobichettipalayam in Erode District of Tamil Nadu state, India. It is located about 3 km from Gobichettipalayam on the way to Anthiyur via Savandapur. It is a religious center with many famous temples including the Pariyur Kondathu Kaliamman temple.

History
The history of the temple dates centuries back. The temple is considered to be more than 1500 years old. The name Pariyur literally came from 'Pari' 'oor' meaning, 'place ruled by Pari'. Vēl Pāri was a great king who is considered in Tamil literature as one of the Kadai ēzhu vallal (literally meaning, the last of the seven great patrons). Arulmigu Kondathu Kaliamman is a powerful Goddess who was the deity responsible for the prosperity of the country ruled by Pari.

Temples

Kondathu Kaliamman Temple
Pariyur Kondathu Kaliamman Temple is situated in Pariyur, about 3 km from Gobichettipalayam, where a 'Fire Walking Ceremony' (Kundam) is held during January every year. The annual Temple Car festival is celebrated here with grandeur, and the temple attracts a large gathering from the surrounding places all the time. Around 1500 years old, the inner sanctum of the temple is made of black marble. The presiding deity of the temple is Kaliamman for whom the temple is named.  She is considered an aspect of the mother Goddess Parvathi, consort of Lord Siva.  Many other God and Goddess statues are also present, one of which is the protector God, Maha Muniappan, who blesses couples with children and chases fear away from the minds of the people. There are other shrines dedicated to Ganesha, and shrines of Saptha Kannigai, Ponkaliamman, Brahma and other Hindu Gods. The temple has a wedding hall and a golden chariot dedicated to the goddess.

Amarapaneeswarar Temple
Amarapaneeswarar Temple is a temple dedicated to Lord Shiva and his consort Soundaranayaki Amman located in Pariyur. The temple itself is built completely of white marble and there are separate shrines dedicated to warlord Karthikeya with his wives Deivayanai and Valli, Ganesha known as Anukkai Vinayakar, Nandi, the vehicle of Lord Shiva. There are also shrines dedicated to Navagraha, Bhairava, Nayanmars and other Hindu Gods. Maha Shivaratri and Pradhosam is celebrated with much grandeur apart from other festivals of Shiva and Murugan.

Adinarayanaswamy Temple
Adinarayana Swamy Temple is a temple dedicated to Lord Vishnu located at Pariyur and the chief deity the temple is Adhi Narayana Perumal. He is seen along with his companions Sri Devi and Bhu Devi. The specialty of the temple is that, there is a separate shrine dedicated to Lord Hanuman. The statues of Sanjeevi Anjaneyar, Veera Anjaneyar and Alwars are seen inside the main temple complex. Garuda Alwar is seen in front of the main sanctum. The main Gopuram of the temple depicts the scene of narration of Bhagavad Gita, the holy book of Hindus. Vaikunta Ekadashi and other festivals of Vishnu are celebrated here.

Ankalamman Temple
There is also a small temple dedicated to Sri Ankalamman.

Hill Temples
Balamurugan Temple, Pachaimalai is one of the two old hill temples dedicated to Lord Murugan, while the other is Muthukumaraswamy Temple, Pavalamalai. Both the temples are located within a few miles from the heart of the town. All Saivite, Koumaram and other Hindu festivals are celebrated at the temple, especially Thai Poosam, Panguni Uthiram and Skanda Sashti. There is a huge statue of Lord Murugan, which can be seen miles away from the temple. Apart from his normal peacock mount, the temple also has a Golden Chariot.

Connectivity
Pariyur is situated on a major highway connecting Gobichettipalayam and Anthiyur via Savandapur. Bus services are available frequently from Gobichettipalayam. To get there by road, reach Gobichettipalayam and travel further 3 km to reach Pariyur. By rail, reach Erode (40 km) and then travel by road via Gobichettipalayam or Anthiyur. The nearest airport is Coimbatore, 85 km away. This table gives the distance from major cities:

Wedding ceremonies
Because of cultural and religious importance, people prefer Pariyur for weddings.  There is a wedding hall which was constructed newly at a cost of over 60 lakhs.

Filmography
The temple is famous for the films that were shot here.  Many Tamil and Malayalam films have been shot in and around the temple.

References

Sources
https://web.archive.org/web/20130614095321/http://pariyurkondathukaliamman.org/
https://web.archive.org/web/20131109105313/http://www.pachaimalai.in/Eng/pariyur.htm
http://temple.dinamalar.com/en/new_en.php?id=773

Villages in Erode district